The 1880 Michigan gubernatorial election was held on November 2, 1880. Republican nominee David Jerome defeated Democratic nominee Frederick M. Holloway with 51.25% of the vote.

General election

Candidates
Major party candidates
David Jerome, Republican
Frederick M. Holloway, Democratic
Other candidates
David Woodman, Greenback
Isaac W. McKeever, Prohibition
Cornelius Quick, American Labor Party

Results

References

1880
Michigan
Gubernatorial
November 1880 events